James Edward Tuttiett (born October 1963) is a British businessman, who through his company, E&J Estates, owns the freehold of 40,000 residential properties in the UK.

Early life
James Edward Tuttiett was born in October 1963.

Career
Tuttiett founded E&J Estates in 1991.

According to data from Companies House, Tuttiett is a director of 85 companies, and often the only director, that own the freehold of numerous large developments in UK cities including Newcastle, Birmingham, Leeds, Coventry and London.

Personal life
Tuttiett lives in a "listed property in an exclusive part of Hampshire near Winchester, surrounded by his own vineyard".

See also 
 Mike Greene, former business partner and Brexit Party candidate

References

External links
Tuttiett profile at E&J Capital Partners

Living people
1963 births
British businesspeople